Tomáš Vlasák (born February 1, 1975) is a Czech former professional hockey player that plays for the Plzeň HC in the Czech Extraliga. He played 10 games with the Los Angeles Kings during the 2000-2001 season.

Career statistics

Regular season and playoffs

International

External links
 

1975 births
Living people
Ak Bars Kazan players
Czech ice hockey centres
Czech expatriate ice hockey players in Russia
HC Litvínov players
HC Plzeň players
HC Slavia Praha players
Los Angeles Kings draft picks
Los Angeles Kings players
Ice hockey people from Prague
Czech expatriate ice hockey players in Sweden
Czech expatriate ice hockey players in Switzerland
Czechoslovak ice hockey centres
Czech expatriate ice hockey players in the United States